Rashid Mohamed (born Rachid Khouia; 9 November 1979 in Salé, Morocco) is a Bahraini runner. He specializes in the 800 metres. His personal best time is 1:45.38 minutes, achieved in June 1999 in Milan.

Career
Mohamed switched nationality from his birth country of Morocco in 2002 and soon won the 2002 Asian Games. This was Bahrain's first Asian Games medal since 1986. The next year, he won the bronze medal at the 2003 Asian Championships. Mohamed also competed at the World Championships in 1999 and 2003 without reaching the final.

Achievements

References

1979 births
Living people
Bahraini male middle-distance runners
Asian Games medalists in athletics (track and field)
Athletes (track and field) at the 2002 Asian Games
Moroccan male middle-distance runners
Moroccan emigrants to Bahrain
Asian Games gold medalists for Bahrain
Medalists at the 2002 Asian Games